The Sports Bra is a women's sports-focused bar in Portland, Oregon. The bar opened for business on April 1, 2022.

Description
Located at 25th Avenue and Broadway in northeast Portland's Sullivan's Gulch neighborhood, The Sports Bra is an LGBTQ-owned bar focused on women's sports. The menu includes burgers, buffalo wings, and Vietnamese-style baby back ribs. The all-ages bar hosts official Portland Thorns viewing parties.

Jaylon Thompson of USA Today has called the business "a unique concept" with an owner who "aims to build community, empower and promote women in sports". According to Erin Rook of LGBTQ Nation, The Sports Bra "may be the world's first women's sports bar". Similarly, Lizzy Acker of The Oregonian said the business "might be the only women's sports bar in the world".

History
Local chef and former basketball player Jenny Nguyen opened the bar in April 2022. She conceived the idea after watching the 2018 NCAA Division I women's basketball tournament in a crowded sports bar on mute. Inspired by her girlfriend, the United States women's national soccer team's fight for equal pay, and the success of the MeToo movement, Nguyen started the business with support from a Kickstarter campaign, which had raised approximately $95,000 by March 2022. She also partnered with female-owned breweries in the Portland metropolitan area, including Freeland Spirits, Herbucha, and Migration.

In 2023, the bar hosted a Lunar New Year celebration and benefit for the Asian Pacific American Network of Oregon featuring a performance by White Lotus Lion Dance.

References

External links

 
 
 Portland’s first women's sports bar plans its opening (March 7, 2022), KPTV

2022 establishments in Oregon
2022 in LGBT history
2022 in women's sport
Drinking establishments in Oregon
Kickstarter projects
LGBT culture in Portland, Oregon
Restaurants in Portland, Oregon
Sullivan's Gulch, Portland, Oregon